Indian Institute of Skiing and Mountaineering (IIS&M) was established in 1969 at Gulmarg by the Department of Tourism and the Government of India. The institute is chartered to train skiers and mountaineers from all over the world.

History
Founded in 1969, initially IIS&M was started as a Project named Gulmarg Winter Sports Project (GWSP) in order to develop ski resorts of international standard in Gulmarg. Now it has grown into an institute which conducts various adventure courses and corporate activities.

Courses
The institute conducts courses on various fields such as skiing, water skiing, paragliding, paramotors, parasailing, hot air ballooning, canoeing, white water rafting, and mountaineering etc.

References

External links
 Official website

Education in Jammu and Kashmir
Mountaineering in India
Skiing in India
Mountaineering training institutes